Pesa Twist is a articulated low floor tram produced in Bydgoszcz by Pesa SA. The Twist is currently operated in Częstochowa, Górnośląski Okręg Przemysłowy, Moscow,  Kyiv, Kraków and Wrocław. Tallinn has made an order of the trams.

History 
In 2006 Pesa Bydgoszcz started the production of trams. Until 2008, the Tramicus model was built, and in 2010 the production of wagons from the Swing family began. Their constructions were similar – the tram with a length of about 30 m had 5 sections and moved on 3 rigid trolleys.

In the same year MPK Częstochowa announced a tender for the purchase of brand new low-floor trams, because due to the planned opening of a new tram line, the needs of rolling stock increased. The carrier, due to the poor condition of the tracks, wanted to purchase trams with a lower static axle load on the track than provided for by the Polish standard. Another requirement of the customer was all swivel bogies with a classic axial wheelset.

In 2012 Silesian Interurbans bought 30 Pesa twist-step trams, and a year later Moscow bought 120 Pesa Fokstrot units (based on Twist-Step). In the following year, MPK Kraków bought 36 trams, and in 2015 MPK Wrocław also bought Pesa Twist trams.

Gallery

See also
Transport in Poland
List of rolling stock manufacturers

References

External links

Twist